Mariana di Girolamo Arteaga (born 22 October 1990) is a Chilean film and television actress. Di Girolamo had several major roles including her performance as Ema in the 2019 film Ema and La Verónica, in addition to television roles such as Perdona nuestros pecados.

References

External links 

1990 births
Living people
Chilean film actresses